El Grado is a municipality located in the province of Huesca, Aragon, Spain. According to 2009 data (INE), the municipality has a population of 506 inhabitants.

There is a large reservoir, managing the waters of river Cinca in this town's municipal term.

References

Municipalities in the Province of Huesca